Buchwaldoboletus pseudolignicola is a species of bolete fungus in the family Boletaceae native to Japan.

Taxonomy and naming 
Originally described as Pulveroboletus pseudolignicola in 1987, it was reclassified to the genus Buchwaldoboletus in 2011.

Description 
The cap is 4–17 cm, pulvinate to plane, velutinous, silky and tomentose, viscid when wet. Its color is yellow to cinnamon-brown. The pores are small and chrome yellow, tubes arcuate-decurrent; yellow, and context yellow, bluing when bruised. The stipe is 5–8 cm × 2–6 mm, central to sub eccentric, firm, yellow to orange, darker toward the base, bruising blue, and there is a yellow mycelium at the stipe base.

Spores are 5–7 × by.5–4.5 µm.

Distribution and ecology 
Buchwaldoboletus sphaerocephalus has been recorded in Japan, growing on sawdust of pines, fruiting July to September.

References

External links 

 

Boletaceae
Fungi described in 1987
Fungi of Japan